Tom Fitzgerald or Thomas Fitzgerald, Thomas FitzGerald may refer to:

 Tom Fitzgerald (economist) (1918–1993), Australian, delivered 1990 Boyer Lectures
 Tom Fitzgerald (handballer) (born 1966), American handball player
 Tom Fitzgerald (soccer) (1951–2004), American soccer coach from Florida
 Tom Fitzgerald (ice hockey) (born 1968), retired ice hockey player for the Boston Bruins and other teams
 Tom Fitzgerald (journalist) (1912–1983), American newspaper journalist for The Boston Globe'''
 Tom Fitzgerald (reporter), American television newscaster
 Tom Fitzgerald (Irish politician) (1939–2013), Irish Fianna Fáil politician, senator 1981–1982, 1987–2002
 Tom Fitzgerald, in The Great Brain'' children's fictional series
 Thom Fitzgerald (born 1968), American-Canadian film director
 Thomas Fitzgerald (American politician) (1796–1855), judge and state legislator in both Indiana and Michigan, and U.S. Senator from Michigan
 Thomas FitzMaurice FitzGerald (1175–1213)
 Thomas FitzGerald, 2nd Earl of Kildare (died 1328), Lord Justice of Ireland
 Thomas FitzGerald, 7th Earl of Kildare (c. 1421–1477), Lord Chancellor of Ireland
 Thomas FitzGerald, 10th Earl of Kildare (1513–1537), also known as Silken Thomas
 Thomas FitzGerald, 2nd Baron Desmond (c. 1260–1298), Lord Justice of Ireland
 Thomas FitzGerald, 3rd Baron Desmond (1290–1307)
 Thomas FitzGerald, 5th Earl of Desmond (c. 1386–1420), subject of a poem by Thomas Moore
 Thomas FitzGerald, 7th Earl of Desmond (died 1467/68), Lord Deputy of Ireland
 Thomas FitzGerald, 11th Earl of Desmond (1454–1534)
 Thomas FitzGerald (County Louth politician) (died 1834), Irish politician and slave trader
 Thomas FitzGerald, Earl of Offaly (1974–1997), only son of Maurice FitzGerald, 9th Duke of Leinster
 Thomas Henry Fitzgerald (1824–1888), pioneer in sugar cane farming and politics in the early days of the colony of Queensland, Australia
 Thomas Naghten Fitzgerald (1838–1908), Irish-born surgeon, active in Australia
 Thomas R. Fitzgerald (judge) (1941–2015), Chief Justice of the Illinois Supreme Court
 Thomas R. Fitzgerald (Jesuit) (1922–2004), President of Fairfield University
 Thomas W. Fitzgerald, American lawyer and judge from New York
 Thomas Fitzgerald (composer), Australian composer, musical director, conductor and musician
 Tommy Fitzgerald (born 1970), Irish soccer player